In biology, a lumen (plural lumina) is the inside space of a tubular structure, such as an artery or intestine. It comes .

It can refer to:
The interior of a vessel, such as the central space in an artery, vein or capillary through which blood flows.
The interior of the gastrointestinal tract
The pathways of the bronchi in the lungs
The interior of renal tubules and urinary collecting ducts
The pathways of the female genital tract, starting with a single pathway of the vagina, splitting up in two lumina in the uterus, both of which continue through the fallopian tubes

In cell biology, a lumen is a membrane-defined space that is found inside several organelles, cellular components, or structures:
thylakoid, endoplasmic reticulum, Golgi apparatus, lysosome, mitochondrion, or microtubule

Transluminal procedures
Transluminal procedures are procedures occurring through lumina, including:
Natural orifice transluminal endoscopic surgery in the lumina of, for example, the stomach, vagina, bladder, or colon
 Procedures through the lumina of blood vessels, such as various interventional radiology procedures: 
 Percutaneous transluminal angioplasty 
 Percutaneous transluminal commissurotomy

See also
Foramen, any anatomical opening
Thylakoid lumen

References

Anatomy
Blood